Baptiste Canelhas Reiffers (born 9 May 2000) is a French professional footballer who plays as a midfielder for  club Châteauroux.

Career
Canelhas signed his first professional contract with Châteauroux on 12 June 2020. He made his professional debut with Châteauroux in a 3–3 Ligue 2 tie against Valenciennes on 23 January 2021.

On 4 January 2022, he joined Créteil on loan until the end of the season.

References

External links
 
 Berrichone Profile

2000 births
Living people
Sportspeople from Indre
Association football midfielders
French footballers
LB Châteauroux players
US Créteil-Lusitanos players
Ligue 2 players
Championnat National players
Championnat National 3 players
Footballers from Centre-Val de Loire